St. George's Hospital Reports was a medical journal. The journal was published on behalf of St George's Hospital by John Churchill & Sons and then by J & A Churchill after John Churchill, Sr.'s retirement in 1870. There were ten volumes with articles dated from 1866 to 1879.

Issues
Volumes I–VI, one volume per year from 1866 to 1871, edited by John William Ogle and Timothy Holmes
Volume VII, 1872–1874, edited by John William Ogle and Timothy Holmes
Volume VIII, 1874–1876, edited by William Howship Dickinson and Timothy Holmes
Volume IX, 1877–1878, edited by William Howship Dickinson and T. Pickering Pick
Volume X, 1879 (published 1880), edited by Thomas Tillyer Whipham and T. Pickering Pick

References

Defunct journals of the United Kingdom
Publications established in 1866
Publications disestablished in 1879
English-language journals
General medical journals
1866 establishments in England